Cheonggu Station is a subway station located in Jung-gu, a district of Seoul, South Korea. This station is served by Line 5 and Line 6 of the Seoul Subway.

Station layout

Vicinity
Exit 1: Jangchung Elementary School
Exit 2: Heungin Elementary School
Exit 3: Cheonggu Elementary School

References 

Railway stations opened in 1996
Seoul Metropolitan Subway stations
Metro stations in Jung District, Seoul